Ballingarry A.F.C. is an amateur Ireland football (soccer) club from Ballingarry, County Limerick, Ireland, the club was founded in February 1984 that currently competes in the Limerick Desmond League.

History
Ballingarry A.F.C. was formed in February 1984. At a meeting held at the time, it decided to enter a team in the Desmond District League for the coming 1984/85 season. The club's colours were agreed to yellow and green, which with little variation, remain in place today.

The club entered Division 2B of the Desmond District League, and the club played their first competitive game in September 1984, in Askeaton against the local B team. The game ended with a 4–3 victory.

Club crest
Following the club's Annual General Meeting in June 1989, a crest for the club was researched and designed. The crest is divided into three sections, the top scroll showing the name of the club and the year of the formation of the club.

The middle section is a shield subdivided into 3 parts and joined by a football. The top section depicts a hill, and is a reference to Knockfierna hill, a local landmark. In the lower left section is a lion, which is the DeLacy Desmond crest, who were the one-time owners of Ballingarry castle, which is shown in the lower right section. In the bottom scroll is the Latin phrase "Meritis Augentur Honores" ("Rewards Increase With Effort").

Role of honour
Ballingarry A.F.C. has enjoyed its fair share of success in the Desmond League, both in its early years, and most recently since the turn of the millennium. The first silverware won was when the team swept to the Division 3 League title for season 1985/86, a tremendous achievement for a club so young. Another notable success was victory in the Munster Junior Area Cup in 1988/89.

Club honours
 1985/86 – Division 3 League Champions
 1987 – Park United Tournament Winners
 1987/88 – Division 2 Runners-up (Promoted)
 1988 – Park United Tournament Runners-up
 1988/89 – Munster Junior Cup Area Winners
 1988/89 – F.A.I. Area Cup Runners-up
 1992/93 – Division 1 League Cup Runners-up
 1993/94 – Division 1 Runners-up (Promoted)
 1999 – Foynes Tournament Runners-up
 1999/2000 – Division 1 League Cup Runners-up
 2001/02 – Desmond Cup Winners
 2001/02 – Division 1 League Cup Runners-up
 2002/03 – Division 1 League Champions
 2003/04 – Premier Division League Champions (Won Play-Off)
 2004/05 – Premier Division League Cup Runners-up
 2006/07 – Desmond Cup Winners
 2007/08 – Division 1 Double Winners (League & League Cup)
 2008/09 – Division 3 League Champions (B Team)

A full roll of honour for underage and senior sides is available here

References

External links
 

Association football clubs established in 1984
Association football clubs in County Limerick
1984 establishments in Ireland